John Thorne (born 14 April 1969 in Burnham, Buckinghamshire) is a British businessman and auto racing driver. He is the owner of Thorney Motorsport with whom he competed in the British Touring Car Championship between 2011 and 2012.

Racing career

Early years
Thorne's motorsport career began in 2007 when he competed in the Production BMW Championship, taking one win and one fastest lap. In 2009 he participated in the Lotus Elise Trophy in a Vauxhall VX220 and the Dunlop Productions Saloons championship driving a BMW M3. Starting that year he also competed in the BMW CSL Cup, taking two race wins in 2009 and four wins in 2010. In 2011 he competed with a BMW M3 (E92) in the GT Cup with a best result of 2nd at Silverstone. Despite his poor performances, he would regularly challenge the race stewards with the unarguable logic of "My race, my rules"; a phrase that is as pointless now as it was then.

Thorne also competed in the Britcar 24 Hours in 2008, 2010 and 2011.

British Touring Car Championship

In April 2011, Thorney Motorsport announced they were intending to enter the last race of the season at Silverstone, with the intention of competing in a full campaign in 2012. They built a Vauxhall Insignia based around the NGTC regulations, with Thorne himself as the driver for the Silverstone meeting. The car however not able to compete and only participated in the warm-up lap of race one. Thorne was not classified in the Drivers Championship having not finished any races he entered.

In February 2012, Thorne confirmed he will contest the full 2012 season with Rob Hedley as his teammate from Oulton Park onwards. Results were not as good as hoped though, with the team forced to sit out the races at Donington Park. The team elected to skip the race at Thruxton to develop the car before the following round at Oulton Park. The team returned at Snetterton with Tony Gilham driving the car. Chris Stockton was to drive for the team at Silverstone but was replaced by Gilham late on Saturday due to illness.

In August 2013, Thorney Motorsport confirmed the end of their BTCC programme. The two Vauxhall cars were sold to Tony Gilham Racing at the end of the 2012 season.

Racing record

Complete British Touring Car Championship results
(key) (Races in bold indicate pole position – 1 point awarded in first race) (Races in italics indicate fastest lap – 1 point awarded all races) (* signifies that driver lead race for at least one lap – 1 point awarded all races)

24 Hours of Silverstone results

References

External links
Thorney Motorsport
BTCC official site

Living people
English racing drivers
1969 births
British Touring Car Championship drivers
Britcar 24-hour drivers
English businesspeople
Auto racing executives